The Lent Bumps 2002 were a series of rowing races held at Cambridge University from Wednesday 1 March 2002 until Saturday 4 March 2002. The event was run as a bumps race and has been held annually in late-February or early March since 1887. See Lent Bumps for the format of the races. In 2002, a total of 121 crews took part (69 men's crews and 52 women's crews), with nearly 1100 participants.

The bumps were scheduled to run from Tuesday 28 February. The racing was cancelled on the Tuesday due to extremely strong and gusty winds. Crews in the 1st divisions were unaffected by the cancellation, since the first scheduled race for the top divisions was on Wednesday.

Head of the River crews 
 Caius men bumped First and Third Trinity and Emmanuel to regain the headship they lost in 2000.

 Emmanuel women bumped Trinity Hall and Jesus to take their 10th headship of the Lent Bumps since 1988.

Highest 2nd VIIIs 
 The highest men's 2nd VIII for the 3rd consecutive year was Caius II.

 The highest women's 2nd VIII for the 2nd consecutive year was Jesus II.

Links to races in other years

Bumps Charts 
Below are the bumps charts for the 1st and 2nd divisions, with the men's event on the left and women's event on the right. The bumps chart represents the progress of every crew over all four days of the racing. To follow the progress of any particular crew, simply find the crew's name on the left side of the chart and follow the line to the end-of-the-week finishing position on the right of the chart.

Lent Bumps results
2002 in English sport
2002 in rowing